Coleophora murinella is a moth of the family Coleophoridae. It is found from Fennoscandia and northern Russia to the Alps and from Germany to the Baltic states and Poland.

The larvae feed on Vaccinium vitis-idaea. They create a spatulate leaf case of 6–8 mm long, composed of two elongates pieces of epidermis. The case is straight and the rear end is somewhat pointed and bivalved. The mouth angle is about 90°. Full-grown larvae can be found in autumn.

References

murinella
Moths described in 1848
Moths of Europe